Carine Burgy (born 19 May 1970) is a retired French Paralympic powerlifter. Burgy won two silver medals in powerlifting at three Games, two-time World Championship medalist and a double European champion.

Burgy is an active member of the French Federation of Youth and Sports, recognised as a Knight in the National Order of Merit in 2000 and an Officer of the National Order of Merit in 2004.

References

External links 
 

1970 births
Living people
Sportspeople from Colmar
Paralympic powerlifters of France
Powerlifters at the 2000 Summer Paralympics
Powerlifters at the 2004 Summer Paralympics
Powerlifters at the 2008 Summer Paralympics
French emigrants to Switzerland
Knights of the Ordre national du Mérite
Officers of the Ordre national du Mérite
Medalists at the 2000 Summer Paralympics
Medalists at the 2004 Summer Paralympics
Paralympic medalists in powerlifting
Paralympic silver medalists for France